Talk Memphis is an album by Austin, Texas-based blues singer Toni Price, released on October 2, 2007. Price moved to San Diego shortly before the album's release. The album's title—and that of its title track—was originally the name of a Jesse Winchester album and its title track.

Reception

Some critics have noted that Talk Memphis contains many songs by artists from Memphis, and that it is therefore dedicated to the "sounds" of that city. Others, however, have compared its music to that from Price's hometown of Austin, Texas.

Track listing

Charts

References

Toni Price albums
2007 albums
Blues albums by American artists